Tzeporah Berman (born 5 February 1969) is a Canadian environmental activist, campaigner and writer. She is known for her role as one of the organizers of the logging blockades in Clayoquot Sound, British Columbia in 1992–93.

In 2009, Berman served on British Columbia's Green Energy Task Force. The task force, appointed by Premier Gordon Campbell, was charged with making recommendations on the development of renewable energy for the province.  Berman was one of the experts in the environmental documentary The 11th Hour, produced by Leonardo DiCaprio. She was named as one of six Canadian nominees for the Schwab Foundation for Social Entrepreneurship social entrepreneur of the year award, one of "50 Visionaries Changing the World" in Utne Reader and as "Canada's Queen of Green" in a cover story by Reader's Digest. She was included in the Royal British Columbia Museum permanent exhibit of "150 people who have changed the face of British Columbia." In 2015 Berman served on the British Columbia Governments Climate Leadership Team and was appointed in 2016 to serve on the Alberta Governments Oil Sands Advisory Group as co-chair.  Berman was listed of one of the 35 Most Influential Women in British Columbia by BC Business Magazine and awarded an Honorary Doctorate of Law from University of British Columbia.

Berman is an adjunct professor at the Faculty of Environmental Studies, at York University in Toronto.

Early life and education
Berman grew up in London, Ontario, the third of four siblings in a middle-class Jewish family. Her father owned a small advertising company and her mother had a business that made promotional flags and pennants. The family spent summers at her mother's family's cottage in Lake of the Woods. Her father died when Berman was in her early teens and her mother died two years later.

After high school, Berman moved to Toronto to attend Ryerson University's fashion arts design program. While she was successful in design—Harry Rosen, who judged the school's final show called her a "bright light on Canada's fashion scene," Berman left the program after a year to pursue environmental studies going on to obtain a BA with Honors from the University of Toronto Innis College (awarded Douglas Pimlott award) and then a Master's in Environmental Studies from York University.  In 2013 Berman was awarded a Honorary Doctorate of Laws from the University of British Columbia in recognition of her work to strengthen environmental laws and policy in British Columbia, Canada.

Career and research
In 1992, Berman travelled to the Carmanah Valley on Vancouver Island to do fieldwork on threatened seabirds. The following year when she returned to continue her survey, she found that a logging crew had clear-cut the hillside. In 1993, the Clayoquot Sound Land Use Decision had granted pulp-and-paper giant MacMillan Bloedel rights to clear cut two thirds of a 650,000 acre lowland coastal temperate rainforest, the largest of its kind in the world. Berman joined with Valerie Langer and members of Friends of Clayoquot Sound in the growing Clayoquot protests.

That summer, Friends of Clayoquot Sound and Greenpeace launched blockades against the logging. Berman came to national and international attention as one of the spokespersons for the protests, which employed nonviolent civil disobedience tactics taught in a series of peace camps in Tofino and in high-profile locations such as Stanley Park in Vancouver. The blockades lasted for five months and became the largest act of civil disobedience in Canadian history; over 850 people were arrested.
 
Berman played a key role in the negotiations between MacMillan Bloedel (now owned by Weyerhaeuser), the activists and local First Nations. MacMillan Bloedel agreed to hand over its logging rights in Clayoquot Sound to Indigenous-controlled companies who would keep the old-growth forests intact.

By the late 1990s, Greenpeace had been successful in Europe using ad campaigns against companies engaging in practices considered damaging to the environment. In 2000, Berman co-founded ForestEthics, a group devoted to using tactics that would convince companies to change their ways or risk loss of sales. One of Berman's first successful actions was the Victoria's Secret campaign. The company had been printing a million copies per day of its glossy catalogues using paper from old-growth timber. The ForestEthics campaign initiated street-theatre demonstrations and fake fashion ads to force the undergarment manufacturer to consider changing its practices.

After a few weeks, Berman was able to negotiate different wood-pulp sources with company management. Similar campaigns targeting Staples and Office Depot led them to reconsider using old-growth timber. The strategy was not just to tell companies what they should stop doing, but rather "what they should continue doing and start doing in order to stay in business but avoid protests." Berman went on to be one of the lead negotiators in the Canadian Boreal Forest Agreement.

In 2004, Berman switched her focus to climate change, founding a nonprofit environmental organization called PowerUp Canada that worked successfully to create greater support in Canada for carbon pricing and defended the BC carbon tax from critics threatening to "axe the tax."  In 2010 Berman was hired to Co-Direct Greenpeace International's Climate and Energy program in 40 countries.  In that capacity she was the team leader for the creation of the Arctic campaign, contributed to the campaign to get Volkswagen to support vehicle efficiency regulations in the EU and ran a successful campaign against Facebook, on Facebook, to encourage the company to demand renewable energy in its procurement for data centers.  Before leaving Greenpeace she helped to design and coordinate the "Clean Our Cloud" campaign that encouraged the largest IT companies in the world such as Apple and Google to demand and invest in renewable energy.

In 2012, Berman moved back to Canada and began consulting with philanthropic foundations, environmental organizations and First Nations on climate and energy policy and to design campaigns on oil sands and pipelines. In 2015 Berman was appointed by the British Columbia Government to the Climate Leadership Team to make recommendations on climate policy in British Columbia. In 2016, she was appointed to be co-chair of the Oil Sands Advisory Group by the Alberta Government to make recommendations on implementing the new Climate Leadership Plan, reviewing cumulative impacts of oil sands operations and design climate recommendations for the pathway to 2050.

In 2018, Berman came on board with Stand.earth, formerly ForestEthics, as International Program Director. In 2020 she launched the Fossil Fuel Non-Proliferation Treaty Initiative, of which she is the chair.

Selected works

Books
 Berman, Tzeporah, with Mark Leiren-Young. (2011). This Crazy Time: Living our environmental challenge.  Toronto: Alfred A. Knopf Canada. 
 Berman  Tzeporah, Christopher Hatch; Maurice Gibbons; Ronald B. Hatch; Gordon Brent Ingram; Loys Maingon (1994). Clayoquot & Dissent. Ronsdale Press.

Articles
 Tzeporah Berman, Peter Newell, Matthew Stilwell (4 February 2020) Cold War lesson for the climate change era: Why we need a Fossil Fuel Non-Proliferation Treaty. Bulletin of the Atomic Scientists.
 Berman, Tzeporah (19 February 2013) Washington is right: Canada must confront its climate neglect. The Globe and Mail. 
 Berman, Tzeporah (2 May 2012). Oil, dissent and the future of Canada. The Globe and Mail.

See also
 Fossil Fuel Non-Proliferation Treaty Initiative
 Great Bear Rainforest
 Greenpeace

References

External links

Official website

 Hamilton, Gordon (24 May 2013). "UBC bestows doctorate on 'whacked-out nature worshipper' Tzeporah Berman." Vancouver Sun. 
 Hampson, Sarah (3 October 2011). "Activist Tzeporah Berman steps out of the trees and into the boardroom." The Globe and Mail.
 Langlois, Christine (November, 2009). "The Queen of Green." Reader's Digest.
 Ross, Nicola (30 November 2011). "Reflections of a determined environmentalist." The Globe and Mail.
 Saunders, Doug (24 May 2011). "Greenpeace: tactics not so clear cut anymore." The Globe and Mail.
 Braid, Don (15 July 2016).  Calgary Herald

Video
Business and Climate Summit 2016 with Steve Williams CEO of Suncor.  
 Goodman, Amy (24 September 2013). Corroding Our Democracy: Canada Silences Scientists, Targets Environmentalists in Tar Sands Push. Democracy Now!
 Stromboulopoulos, George  (10 October 2011). Guest Interview: Tzeporah Berman.  George Stroumboulopoulos Tonight, CBC Television.
 Kiefer, Fanny "Tzeporah Berman on Studio 4 with Fanny Kiefer" (Part 1); (Part 2). Shaw TV
 Gregg, Allan (22 October 2011). "Tzeporah Berman on past and present environmental challenges." Allan Gregg in Conversation with..., TVOntario.

Audio
 Anna Maria Tremonti (19 September 2011). Game Changer: Tzeporah Berman. The Current, CBC Radio One

1969 births
Canadian conservationists
Canadian women non-fiction writers
Non-fiction environmental writers
Writers from London, Ontario
Living people
Sustainability advocates
University of Toronto alumni
Jewish Canadian activists
Canadian public relations people
Canadian civil servants
Climate activists
21st-century Canadian non-fiction writers
21st-century Canadian women writers
Jewish Canadian writers